Ludwik Malinowski may refer to:

Ludwik Malinowski (resistance) (1887–1962), Polish resistance fighter
Ludwik Malinowski (professor), succeeded Hryhoriy Yakhymovych as Rector of Lviv University